The 1897–98 Ottawa Hockey Club season was the club's 13th season of play. Ottawa placed fifth in the league.

Team business 
Directors
 Governor General The Earl of Minto – Patron
 Wilfrid Laurier – Vice-patron
 David Maclaren – Honorary president
 A. Z. Palmer – Honorary vice-president
 S. Maynard Rogers – President
 Col. Charles E. Turner – Vice-president
 George P. Spittal – Honorary Secretary
 W. C. Sparks – Honorary Treasurer
 Harvey Pulford – Captain
 George P. Murphy, L. M. Bates, S. Ogilve – Executive committee

Source: 

After not coming to satisfactory terms with the Dey brothers over the Dey Rink, the Ottawas returned to their first home, the Rideau Skating Rink for the season.

Season 
Ottawa lost several players from the previous season to the rival intermediate Ottawa Capitals, including Alf Smith. The Capitals would win the AHAC championship with the Ottawa players and apply to join AHAC seniors in 1898.

Highlights 
The game of February 12, 1898, between Ottawa and the Victorias was notable because Fred Chittick, the regular goalkeeper of Ottawa staged a one-man strike because he had not received his share of complimentary tickets. Ottawa played A. Cope instead and lost 9–5. The fans in attendance heckled the defence pair of Harvey Pulford and Weldy Young, and in response Mr. Young went into the crowd to attack a spectator.

Final standing

Schedule and results

Goaltending averages

Scoring Leaders

Awards and records

Transactions

Roster 
 Fred Chittick – goal
 Patrick Baskerville
 Dave Gilmour
 Howard Hutchison
 Alf Living
 Harvey Pulford
 Harold Rosenthal
 Charlie Spittal
 Harry Westwick
 Fred White
 Weldy Young

See also 

 1898 AHAC season

References 

 

Ottawa Senators (original) seasons
Ottawa